Dust is a 1985 film directed by Marion Hänsel based on the 1977 J. M. Coetzee novel In the Heart of the Country. The film was shot in Spain and is a French-Belgian production. The film was selected as the Belgian entry for the Best Foreign Language Film at the 58th Academy Awards, but was not accepted as a nominee. It won the Silver Lion prize, awarded to the best first or second major work by a director, at the 1985 Venice Film Festival. The jury recognised Jane Birkin's performance as amongst the best of the year, but decided not to award a best actress prize because all of the actresses they judged to have made the best performances were in films that won major awards.

See also
 List of submissions to the 58th Academy Awards for Best Foreign Language Film
 List of Belgian submissions for the Academy Award for Best Foreign Language Film

References

External links
 
 
 
 

1985 films
1985 drama films
French drama films
Films based on South African novels
J. M. Coetzee
Films directed by Marion Hänsel
English-language Belgian films
English-language French films
Belgian drama films
1980s English-language films
1980s French films
English-language drama films